George J. Schoeneman (March 4, 1889February 11, 1966) was an American administrator who served as the Commissioner of Internal Revenue from 1947 to 1951.

References

1889 births
1966 deaths
Commissioners of Internal Revenue
Rhode Island Democrats